Brachylia windhoekensis is a moth in the family Cossidae. It was described by Strand in 1913. It is found in Namibia.

References

Natural History Museum Lepidoptera generic names catalog

Cossinae
Moths described in 1913
Moths of Africa